{{DISPLAYTITLE:2E6 (mathematics)}}
In mathematics, 2E6 is the name of a family of Steinberg or twisted Chevalley groups. It is a quasi-split form of E6, depending on a quadratic extension of fields K⊂L. Unfortunately the notation for the group is not standardized, as some authors write it as 2E6(K) (thinking of 2E6 as an algebraic group taking values in K) and some as 2E6(L) (thinking of the group as a subgroup of E6(L) fixed by an outer involution).

Over finite fields

The group 2E6(q2) has order
q36
(q12 − 1)
(q9 + 1)
(q8 − 1)
(q6 − 1)
(q5 + 1)
(q2 − 1)
/(3,q + 1).
This is similar to the order q36
(q12 − 1)
(q9 − 1)
(q8 − 1)
(q6 − 1)
(q5 − 1)
(q2 − 1)
/(3,q − 1)
of E6(q).

Its Schur multiplier has order (3, q + 1) except for q=2, i. e. 2E6(22), when it has order 12  and is a product of cyclic groups of orders 2,2,3. One of the exceptional double covers of 2E6(22) is a subgroup of the baby monster group,
and the exceptional central extension by the elementary abelian group of order 4 is a subgroup of the monster group.

The outer  automorphism group has order (3, q + 1) · f where q2 = pf.

Over the real numbers

Over the real numbers, 2E6 is the quasisplit form of E6, and is one of the five real forms of E6 classified by Élie Cartan. Its maximal compact subgroup is of type F4.

Remarks

References

Robert Wilson: Atlas of Finite Group Representations: Sporadic groups

Finite groups
Lie groups